Stern Hu (born 1963 in Tianjin) is an Australian businessman jailed in China after pleading guilty to stealing commercial secrets and receiving bribes. Hu was formerly an executive of Rio Tinto mining group in Shanghai, having graduated from Peking University before obtaining Australian citizenship in 1994.  He was released in July 2018 after serving 8 years of a ten year prison sentence.

Conviction in China 
On 5 July 2009, Hu and three Chinese colleagues were detained by the Chinese government. On 29 March 2010, Hu was sentenced to ten years' jail after pleading guilty to stealing commercial secrets and receiving bribes.

According to China state media, data found stored on Hu's personal laptop allegedly contained confidential business information of several dozen major business partners of Rio Tinto, including storage levels and sales plans deemed much too specific and precise to have been acquired legitimately. Hu was accused of having obtained such information through bribery and other illegal means for massive corporate and personal benefits.

Australian Prime Minister Kevin Rudd, a former diplomat to China, refused to intervene on a personal level, and criticised the media and the opposition party for adding political bias to the issue. Australian authorities were granted access to Stern Hu, and Foreign Minister Stephen Smith subsequently declared that he was in good health. After the trial, Rio Tinto terminated the employment of Hu and other convicted executives. According to Rio Tinto's chief executive, the trial would not adversely affect any business connections.

See also
Rio Tinto espionage case
Xue Feng

References

External links
China iron and steel Association
 Experts discuss China's rise, an Australian ABC Lateline TV program (video)

1963 births
2009 in China
Australian businesspeople
Chinese emigrants to Australia
Espionage scandals and incidents
Living people
Businesspeople from Tianjin